Giovanni Pierpaoli (Fano, 1833 -1911) was an Italian painter, depicting portraits, historical canvases, and sacred subjects.

Biography
He was a resident of Fano. In 1870 at Parma, he exhibited a portrait of Giovacchino Rossini. Among his religious canvases are the Martyrdom of Santa Eurosia. Legend holds that this Princess of Aquitaine had her hands cut off by Saracen, for refusing him and his faith. The canvas is at a tomb of a parish church in Pesaro. Pierpaoli was Director from 1883 to 1902 of the School of Arts and Crafts of Fano, now Liceo Artistico Apolloni of Fano. He also wrote poetry. The painter Giusto Cespi (1867-1954) was his grandson and pupil. Pierpaoli's self-portrait is in the Pinacoteca Civica of Fano.

See also
Giovanni Pierpaoli, pittore fanese dell' ottocento. by Adolfo Mabellini; Fano, Tipografia letteraria, 1934.

References

19th-century Italian painters
Italian male painters
20th-century Italian painters
People from Fano
1833 births
1911 deaths
19th-century Italian male artists
20th-century Italian male artists